Union councils of Khulna District are the smallest rural administrative and local government units in Khulna District of Bangladesh. There are 9 upazilas in Khulna district with 67 Union councils. The list are below:

Koyra Upazila
Koyra Upazila has 7 Unions, 63 Wards, 72 Mauzas/Mahallas, and 131 villages.
 Amadi Union 
 Bagali Union
 Moheswaripur Union
 Moharajpur Union
 Koyra Union
 Uttar Bedkashi Union
 Dakshin Bedkashi Union

Dacope Upazila
The administration of Dacope thana was established in 1913 and turned into an Upazila in 1983. It consists of 8 union parishads, 26 mouzas and 107 villages.

 Bajua Union
 Kamarkhola Union
 Tildanga Union
 Sutarkhali Union
 Loudob Union
 Pankhali Union
 Banishanta Union
 Kailashganj Union

Paikgachha Upazila
Paikgacha has 10 unions, 172 mauzas/mahallas, and 212 villages.

 Haridhali Union 
 Garaikhali Union 
 Kapilmuni Union
 Lata Union 
 Deluti Union 
 Lashkar Union 
 Godaipur Union 
 Raruli Union 
 Chandkhali Union 
 Soladana Union

Batiaghata Upazila
Batiaghata has 7 Unions/Wards, 132 Mauzas/Mahallas and 158 villages.

 Batiaghata Union
 Amirpur Union
 Gangarampur Union
 Surkhali Union
 Bhandarkot Union
 Baliadanga Union
 Jalma Union

Phultala Upazila
Phultala has  4 Unions, 18 Mauzas/Mahallas and 25 villages.

 Phultala Union
 Damodor Union
 Atra Gilatala Union
 Jamira Union

Dumuria Upazila
Dumuria Upazila is derived under Dumuria Upazila Parishad. Dumuria has 14 Unions/Wards, 204 Mauzas/Mahallas and 230 villages.

 Dumuria Union
 Maguraghona Union
 Bhandarpara Union
 Sahos Union
 Rudaghara Union
 Gutudia Union
 Shovna Union
 Kharnia Union
 Atalia Union
 Dhamaliya Union
 Magurkhali Union
 Raghunathpur Union
 Rangpur Union
 Sharafpur Union

Terokhada Upazila
Terokhada upazila has 6 unions/wards, 31 mauzas/mahallas and 96 villages.

 Terokhada Union
 Chagladoho Union 
 Barasat Union
 Chasiadaho Union
 Madhupur Union
 Ajgara Union

Dighalia Upazila
Dighalia has 6 Unions, 30 Mauzas/Mahallas, and 41 villages.

 Dighalia Union
 Senhati Union
 Gazirhat Union
 Barakpur Union
 Aranghata Union
 Jogipol Union

Rupsa Upazila
Rupsa has 5 Unions/Wards, 64 Mauzas/Mahallas and 75 villages.

 Aichgati Union
 Shrifaltala Union
 Naihati Union
 TSB Union
 Ghatvog Union

References 

Local government in Bangladesh